Mukteswaram is a village located in Ainavilli Mandal, Konaseema Delta, Amalapuram revenue division in Konaseema district  of Andhra Pradesh, India. It is situated near the River Gautami-Godavari, a tributary to the Godavari. Mukteswaram is one of the three important Ferry points for Kotipalli-Mukteswaram and the other two being; Bodasakurru-Pasarlapudi and Sakhinetipalli-Narasapuram in the Konaseema region. Mukteswaram is 60 km from Kakinada.

References

Villages in Konaseema district